The Chicago, St. Paul, Minneapolis and Omaha Railroad Depot is a former train station located in Menomonie, Wisconsin. It was added to the National Register of Historic Places in 2018. It was built in 1906, and closed to passenger service in 1961.  Today the depot serves as a restaurant.

References

Railway stations on the National Register of Historic Places in Wisconsin
Railway stations in the United States opened in 1906
National Register of Historic Places in Dunn County, Wisconsin
Menomonie
Railway stations closed in 1961
Former railway stations in Wisconsin